The men's C-2 1000 metres was a competition in canoeing at the 1956 Summer Olympics. The C-2 event is raced by two-man sprint canoes. Because there were ten teams in this event, heats were introduced. Both the heats and final took place on December 1.

Medalists

Heats
The ten teams first raced in two heats.  The top four teams in each heat advanced directly to the final.

Final

The Danes originally finished seventh in the final, but were disqualified for reasons not disclosed in the official report.

References

1956 Summer Olympics official report. p. 408.
Sports reference.com 1956 C-2 1000 m results

Men's C-2 1000
Men's events at the 1956 Summer Olympics